Lillo Thomas (born 1961) is an American soul musician. He reached the peak of his success as a recording artist in the 1980s. His most famous songs include "Sexy Girl" and "I'm in Love."

Career
Early in his life, Thomas was a competitive sprint runner. He retired from athletics in 1984 after a car accident in Brazil.

Thomas then quickly established his musical career. His first album, released in 1983 on Capitol Records, charted at #23 on the R&B Albums record charts. Let Me Be Yours also launched his first solo hit, "(You're A) Good Girl", which peaked at #22 on the Hot R&B/Hip-Hop Singles & Tracks. Also a successful session vocalist, he worked with Evelyn "Champagne" King, Kashif, James Ingram, and George Benson, but developed a special relationship with Melba Moore. He wrote the song "Mind Up Tonight" for her and joined her on tour in 1984 as her protege. That same year, he released his second solo album, "All of You", which climbed to #9 on the R&B Albums chart and also reached #186 on the Billboard 200.

In 1985, Thomas toured with comedian Eddie Murphy, but 1987 was the pinnacle of success for his music career when his album Lillo released to become #10 on the R&B Albums chart and launched his most successful single, "I'm in Love." The song reached #2 on the Hot R&B/Hip-Hop Singles & Tracks chart. Two other singles charted, with "Downtown" reaching #11 and "Sexy Girl" at #9 on the same chart.

Thomas returned to recording with a brand new single in 1993. "Out There Doing Wrong", was written, arranged and produced by Thomas and released on THG Music.

In 2010, he released his fourth album, Come and Get It. In 2012, Thomas released his "Greatest Hits" album on the Fitingo Music Label.

Thomas lives in Westchester with his wife Kim, a VP in the Beauty industry. He is also an accomplished painter.

Discography

Albums

Singles

References

External links
 Discography at Discogs.

Living people
1961 births
American soul musicians
American male singers
American male sprinters
Musicians from Brooklyn
Track and field athletes from New York City